Jean-Baptiste Adolphe Charras (7 January 1810 in Phalsbourg – 23 January 1865 in Basel) was a military historian and minister.

He was Deputy Secretary of State for War from 5 April 1848 to 11 May 1848.
He was Minister of War ad interim of 11 May 1848 to 17 May 1848.

1780 births
1857 deaths
People from Phalsbourg
Politicians from Grand Est
Moderate Republicans (France)
French Ministers of War
Members of the 1848 Constituent Assembly
Members of the National Legislative Assembly of the French Second Republic